The women's K-1 500 metres sprint canoeing competition at the 2002 Asian Games in Busan was held on 11 and 12 October at the Nakdong River.

Schedule
All times are Korea Standard Time (UTC+09:00)

Results 
Legend
DNF — Did not finish

Heats 
 Qualification: 1–3 → Final (QF), Rest → Semifinal (QS)

Heat 1

Heat 2

Semifinal 
 Qualification: 1–3 → Final (QF)

Final

References 

2002 Asian Games Official Reports, Page 354
Results

External links 
Official Website

Women's K-1 500 metres